Cissusa inconspicua is a moth of the family Erebidae. It is found in Mexico (Veracruz, Jalisco) and Guatemala.

References

Cissusa
Moths described in 1894